Nova Gorica Grammar School is a coeducational nondenominational public gymnasium school located in Nova Gorica, Slovenia. The school caters for students aged between 15 and 19 and is roughly equivalent to preparatory schools in Anglo-American contexts. The school is considered among the best secondary schools in Slovenia.

History 

It was established after the annexation of the Slovenian Littoral to the Yugoslavia in September 1947. It was initially located in the nearby town of Šempeter pri Gorici. In 1952, it was transferred to a suburb of the town of Nova Gorica, and in 1960 to the current location in the very centre of the town.

Notable alumni 

Many prominent people have attended the Nova Gorica Grammar School since its founding. Among them were:

 Rajko Bratož, historian
 Kostja Gatnik, illustrator
 Robert Golob, politician and businessman
 Dean Komel, philosopher
 Jana Krivec, chess grandmaster
 Branko Marušič, historian
 Tomaž Marušič, lawyer and politician, Minister of Justice of Slovenia (1997-2000)
 Tomaž Mastnak, sociologist, political scientist and columnist
 Iztok Mlakar, actor, singer and songwriter
 Katja Perat, poet
 Borut Pahor, politician, current President of Slovenia
 Senko Pličanič, lawyer and politician, current Slovenian Minister of Justice and Administration 
 Vojteh Ravnikar, architect
 Uroš Seljak, cosmologist, a professor of physics at University of California, Berkeley
Dušan Šinigoj, politician, Prime Minister of the Socialist Republic of Slovenia (1984-1990)
 Mitja Velikonja, sociologist and cultural anthropologist 
 Igor Vidmar, rock musician
 Boštjan Vuga, architect
 Saša Vuga, writer
 Danilo Zavrtanik, physicist 
 Samuel Žbogar, diplomat and politician, Minister of Foreign Affairs of Slovenia (2008-2012)
 Pavel Zgaga, pedagogue and politician, Minister of Education of Slovenia (1999-2000)

References 

Grammar School
Schools in the Slovene Littoral
Gymnasiums in Slovenia
Educational institutions established in 1947
1947 establishments in Yugoslavia